In geometry, the pentagrammic crossed-antiprism is one in an infinite set of nonconvex antiprisms formed by triangle sides and two regular star polygon caps, in this case two pentagrams.

It differs from the pentagrammic antiprism by having opposite orientations on the two pentagrams.

This polyhedron is identified with the indexed name U80 as a uniform polyhedron.

The pentagrammic crossed-antiprism may be inscribed within an icosahedron, and has ten triangular faces in common with the great icosahedron. It has the same vertex arrangement as the pentagonal antiprism. In fact, it may be considered as a parabidiminished great icosahedron.

See also
 Prismatic uniform polyhedron

External links 

http://www.mathconsult.ch/showroom/unipoly/80.html
 http://bulatov.org/polyhedra/uniform/u05.html
 https://web.archive.org/web/20050313234519/http://www.math.technion.ac.il/~rl/kaleido/data/05.html

Prismatoid polyhedra